Marek Wróbel is a Polish ice hockey player who currently plays for KS Cracovia of the Polska Hokej Liga.

References

1989 births
Living people
MKS Cracovia (ice hockey) players
Sportspeople from Gdańsk
Polish ice hockey forwards
Stoczniowiec Gdańsk players
TMH Polonia Bytom players
TKH Toruń players
Polish expatriate ice hockey people
Polish expatriate sportspeople in the United States
Expatriate ice hockey players in the United States